Eurema albula, the ghost yellow, is a butterfly in the  family Pieridae. It is found from southern Texas (where it is a rare stray) south through the West Indies and mainland tropical Central and South America to Brazil. The habitat consists of tropical forests and second growth.

Adults are pure white above with a black tip to forewing. Adults are on wing year round in the tropics. They feed on flower nectar.

The larvae feed on Cassia species (including Cassia fruticosa).

Subspecies
E. a. albula (Surinam, Brazil: Amazonas, Pará)
E. a. sinoe (Godart, 1819) (Brazil)
E. a. marginella (C. & R. Felder, 1861) (Venezuela)
E. a. celata (R. Felder, 1869) (Mexico)
E. a. espinosae (Fernández, 1928) (Peru)
E. a. totora Lamas, 1981 (Peru)

References

Albula
Butterflies of Central America
Pieridae of South America
Butterflies of North America
Butterflies of Trinidad and Tobago
Lepidoptera of Brazil
Lepidoptera of Venezuela
Fauna of the Amazon
Butterflies described in 1776
Taxa named by Pieter Cramer